The United States U-18 women's national soccer team is a youth soccer team operated under the auspices of U.S. Soccer. Its primary role is the development of players in preparation for the senior women's national team, as well as bridging the development between the two major youth competition levels of the U-17 and the U-20.

History
Between 1998 and 2001, the United States U-18 was active as the primary youth-level team. It was led by Shannon Higgins-Cirovski, the first coach in the team's history, through the middle of 1999 before she left for the Maryland Terrapins soccer team. Jay Hoffman, who served as Higgins-Cirovski's assistant, took charge of the team and led them to a gold medal for the 1999 Pan American Games, the first time the tournament was open to women's teams. Among the U-18 women playing at the 1999 Pan American Games were future senior national team members Cat Whitehill and Hope Solo.

In 2001, the United States Soccer Federation decided to change the age limit from the U-18 team to U-19. The move was in preparation for FIFA's introduction of the first ever FIFA U-19 Women's World Championship (which has since changed). The team therefore became dormant with only periodic competitions until 2019, when the Federation (under general manager Kate Markgraf) reinstated all youth-level teams in their own right.

Competitive record

Pan American Games
The under-18 team participated and won the inaugural soccer tournament in the 1999 Pan American Games competing against full national teams. These opportunities are a consequence of holding the FIFA Women's World Cup in the same year as the Pan American Games.

Coaches
  Shannon Higgins-Cirovski (1998–1999)
  Jay Hoffman (1999)
  Steve Swanson (2000)
  Tracey Leone (2001)
  Tracey Kevins (2019)
  Mark Carr (2019)
  Chris Petrucelli (2020)

References

Youth soccer in the United States
Women's national under-18 association football teams
North American national under-18 association football teams
Soc
U18
U18